A White, White Day is a 2019 Icelandic drama film directed by Hlynur Pálmason. It premiered in the International Critics' Week section at the Cannes Film Festival on 16 May 2019. It won Best Film Award at the 2019 Torino Film Festival. It was selected as the Icelandic entry for the Best International Feature Film at the 92nd Academy Awards, but it was not nominated.

Plot
Police chief Ingimundur, whose wife died in a car accident, reluctantly undergoes grief counselling, works constantly on renovating a farm building for his daughter Elín's family, and sometimes looks after her daughter Salka. Elín gives him some of her mother's effects, and he's shocked to find a video evidently recording an affair she had with a man called Olgeir Olafsson. He stakes out Olgeir's home, joining his football club. Bad weather closes the roads; while having a pixellated online therapy session, he snaps and trashes the room, beating up two colleagues when they protest and locking them in the cells. Insulting Salka to get rid of her, he kidnaps Olgeir and takes him at gunpoint to a grave he's dug, demanding to know the truth about the affair, and what Olgeir thought of her. Olgeir obliges and Ingimundur yells in fury; Olgeir flees. The next day Olgeir confronts and stabs Ingimundur, terrifying Salka. With a bleeding arm, Ingimundur carries her home through another white-out, apologising for being rude. Having finally acknowledged his grief and anger, he has a vision of his wife undressing and smiling at him as he weeps.

Cast
 Ingvar Eggert Sigurðsson as Ingimundur
 Ída Mekkín Hlynsdóttir as Salka
 Hilmir Snær Guðnason as Olgeir
 Sara Dögg Ásgeirsdóttir as Ingimundur's wife

Release
A White, White Day had its world premiere in the International Critics' Week section at the Cannes Film Festival on 16 May 2019. It was screened in the Contemporary World Cinema section at the Toronto International Film Festival on 6 September 2019. It was first theatrically released in Island on 6 September 2019 and on VOD by Film Movement Video on 11 August 2020.

Reception

Box office
A White, White Day grossed $0 in North America and $836,600 in other territories, against a production budget of $2.8 million.

Critical response
The website's critics consensus reads: "A White, White Day plunges viewers into the darkness of grief and jealousy, led by Ingvar Eggert Sigurðsson's brilliantly layered performance." On Metacritic, the film has a weighted average score of 81 out of 100, based on 15 critics, indicating "universal acclaim".

Peter Bradshaw of The Guardian praised the film for its "startling aesthetic choices" and "enigmatic opening sequence." Brian Tallerico, writing for RogerEbert.com, gave the film 3 stars whilst positively highlighting leading man Sigurðsson. He also praised the ending with "such a devastating, powerful final shot that it alone erases most criticisms." Variety praised the film's deliberate pacing that is preoccupied less with "ticking-clock storylines" but "slow cinema" often associated with foreign film directors outside the Hollywood bubble. It is described as "a terrifying, soul-rattling character study" which makes Palmasson one of "the most important voices of this emerging generation."

See also
 List of submissions to the 92nd Academy Awards for Best International Feature Film
 List of Icelandic submissions for the Academy Award for Best International Feature Film

References

External links
 
 
 

2019 films
2019 drama films
Icelandic drama films
2010s Icelandic-language films
Films directed by Hlynur Pálmason